Church House may refer to:

Church house, a building used for Christian religious activities

In Australia
Church House, Brisbane

In Uganda
Janani Luwum Church House, building under construction by the Church of Uganda

In the United Kingdom
Church House (Presbyterian Church in Ireland), Northern Ireland, headquarters of the Presbyterian Church in Ireland
Church House, Westminster, headquarters of the Church of England
Church House Investments, a UK private bank
Church House Trust, a UK private bank owned by Virgin Money
Church House Publishing, official publisher for the Church of England
Church House, Warburton
The Church House, Tetbury
Church House, Barnet
Church House, a Grade II listed building in Widecombe in the Moor, Devon
Kennaway House, a Grade II* listed building in Sidmouth, Devon, previously known as the Church House

In the United States
Luke A. Church House, Modesto, California
Cornelius Church House, Clarkesville, Georgia, listed on the National Register of Historic Places (NRHP)
Seymour Church House, Winterset, Iowa
William L. Church House, Newton, Massachusetts
Zalmon Church House, Saline, Michigan, listed on the NRHP
Philetus S. Church House, Sugar Island, Michigan
Tousley-Church House, Albion, New York
Olana State Historic Site, Columbia County, New York, also known as the Frederic E. Church House
Benjamin Church House (Bristol, Rhode Island)
Church House (Columbia, Tennessee), Second Empire style of architecture designed by Peter J. Williamson
Andrew Neill Church House, Seguin, Texas, a Recorded Texas Historic Landmark
Benjamin Church House (Shorewood, Wisconsin)

See also
Church (disambiguation)
House (disambiguation)